East Winch railway station was at East Winch, Norfolk, England on the line between King's Lynn and Swaffham. It closed in 1968.

The signal box from the station lay derelict until it was later salvaged by the Mid-Norfolk Railway for use at Thuxton level crossing where it has since been restored and in working use from 2010 onwards.

History

The Lynn & Dereham Railway Bill received the Royal Assent on 21 July 1845. The line and its stations were opened on 27 October 1846 as far as Narborough.  While the line was still being built the Lynn & Dereham Railway was taken over by the East Anglian Railway on 22 July 1847. 19 days later the line reached Swaffham.

Notes

External links 

Disused railway stations in Norfolk
Former Great Eastern Railway stations
Railway stations in Great Britain opened in 1846
Railway stations in Great Britain closed in 1968
1846 establishments in England
1968 disestablishments in England